The LBC Crew (Long Beach City Crew) were a hip-hop trio from Long Beach, California. They were the first act to be executively-produced by Snoop Dogg.

During their time with Death Row, the LBC Crew recorded a previously unreleased album entitled Haven't U Heard... which remained unreleased until February 8, 2011 when it was released by WideAwake/Death Row. They had a hit single with the song "Beware Of My Crew", from the A Thin Line Between Love and Hate soundtrack album, which was originally intended to be for their debut album. They played on Snoop Dogg's second album Tha Doggfather. The group disbanded following the collapse of Death Row. Since then, unreleased material from the group emerged on the underground.

The LBC Crew remained visible figures in West-Coast hip-hop. Bad Azz released two solo albums under the Doggy Style imprint. Lil C-Style remained part of disorganized Death Row camp. And Techniec recently signed to The Game's The Black Wall Street Records then left to start his own label.

Break-up
Early on in the LBC Crew's lifespan, a small dispute broke out between Lil' C-Style and Snoop Dogg over C-Style's royalties (he claimed he wasn't being paid enough for them). The argument was never settled, resulting in C-Style damaging the original tape of LBC's debut album beyond repair, and telling Snoop he no longer wanted to be part of the group.

Members
Techniec (original member) (David Keith Williams II)
Bad Azz (original member) (Jamarr Antonio Stamps)
Lil' C-Style (original member) (Ronald Peter Griffon)

Discography

Studio albums
 Haven't You Heard... (2011)

Soundtrack appearances

Songs
"Funk With Your Brain (Interlude)" (originally recorded for the album later included on the Snoop Doggy Dogg compilation album, Death Row: The Lost Sessions Vol. 1)
"Tight Situation" (Unreleased)
"Blueberry" (originally recorded for the album later included on, Tha Doggfather)
"Out the Moon /Boom, Boom, Boom" (originally recorded for the album later included in Gridlock'd soundtrack album with 2Pac replacing Lil' C-Style
"Dippin' In My Low-Low" (re-recorded with Shaquille O'Neal for an unreleased Shaq project)
1995: A Thin Line Between Love and Hate soundtrack
LBC Crew : "Beware of my crew EP" #75 US, #51 R&B, #8 Rap, #23 Dance-Maxi
1998: Big C Style Presents: 19th Street LBC Compilation
"Flossin'" (Tray Dee, Bad Azz, Lil' C-Style) (re-up)
2010: The Ultimate Death Row Box Set
"6 Shooter" (Techniec, Bad Azz, Tray Dee, Lil' C-Style)
"Doggystyle 96'" (Bad Azz, Techniec, Lil C-Style, Snoop Doggy Dogg, Warren G)

Solo projects
 Bad Azz – Word on tha Streets (1998)
 Bad Azz – Personal Business (2001)
 Da Hood (including Techniec) – Da Hood (2002) 
 Bad Azz – Money Run (2003)
 Bad Azz – Executive Decision (2004)
 Lil' C-Style – Blacc Balled (2004)
 Kam & Yung Bruh (featuring Techniec) – Fruit Pruno 2 (2016)
 Bad Azz – The Nu Adventures of Bad Azz (2018)

Filmography
February 24, 1996 : Soul Train
Season 25, Episode 817 – themselves
1995: The Show - themselves
1996: A Thin Line Between Love and Hate - themselves
1997: Rhyme & Reason – themselves

References

External links 
Rhyme & Reason at Yahoo! Movies
Bad Azz interview on DubCNN about LBC Crew

Snoop Dogg
Hip hop groups from California
Musicians from Long Beach, California
Gangsta rap groups
G-funk groups
Death Row Records artists